Sacramento Valley Station is an Amtrak railway station in the city of Sacramento, California, at 401 I Street on the corner of Fifth Street. It is the seventh busiest Amtrak station in the country, and the second busiest in the Western United States with thousands of riders a day and over a million passengers per year. Today, it is served by 38 daily Amtrak and Amtrak California trains and many Amtrak Thruway Motorcoaches. It is also the western terminus of the Sacramento RT Gold Line light rail system and the Route 30 bus serving Sacramento State University.

Services

Amtrak

Sacramento is served by four Amtrak routes: two daily long-distance routes, and two Amtrak California corridor routes with multiple daily trains, for a total of 38 daily trains on weekdays and 30 each day on weekends .

The California Zephyr and Coast Starlight are long-distance routes with one train per day in each direction.

The San Joaquins operates a single daily round trip from Bakersfield by way of Modesto and Stockton with Sacramento as the northern terminus. Connections are available via Amtrak Thruway Motorcoach to five additional daily round trips that terminate in Oakland.

The Capitol Corridor operates 15 round trips on weekdays and 11 on weekends; Sacramento is the eastern terminus for all trains except for one daily round trip which continues to Auburn.

In FY2017, Sacramento was the second busiest of Amtrak's 74 California stations, boarding or detraining an average of about 2,941 passengers daily. It is Amtrak's seventh-busiest station nationwide.

Amtrak Thruway

, Amtrak operates Amtrak Thruway bus service on four routes serving Sacramento Valley Station: 
Redding – Chico – Sacramento – Stockton
Lake Tahoe/Stateline – Sacramento
Reno/Sparks – Colfax – Roseville – Sacramento

Connections with Amtrak trains are guaranteed. All passengers travelling on Amtrak Thruway services must include travel on a train as part of their itinerary as traveling solely on Amtrak Thruway Motorcoaches from one point to another is prohibited by California state law to prevent competition with privately operated bus services. An exception is given for the Lake Tahoe/Stateline route, which is not paralleled by any other service.

Some Thruway buses also stop at the State Capitol. The stop is for drop-off only, except for southbound passengers connecting to the San Joaquins at Stockton.

RT Light Rail

Sacramento Valley Station is the western terminus of the Gold Line, one of three routes of the Sacramento RT Light Rail system. The station has a single side platform serving the single-track branch line, with a two-track layover yard to the west.

Local and commuter bus
Fairfield and Suisun Transit Blue Line, El Dorado Transit Sacramento/South Lake Tahoe, and RT bus routes #30 & #38 stop directly at the station. However, most RT bus routes terminate in downtown Sacramento, within several blocks of the station. Additionally, Yolobus, Roseville Transit, El Dorado Transit, and Yuba-Sutter Transit all operate commuter bus routes which terminate in downtown Sacramento.

Future services
Altamont Corridor Express has plans for a future Modesto-Sacramento line. Sacramento is planned to be the north end of the California High-Speed Rail system.

However, Phase 3 of the ongoing renovation project may include additional bus bays to allow Greyhound to use Sacramento Valley Station as well.

Shasta Regional Transit Agency is developing a weekday commuter bus from Redding and Red Bluff to the Sacramento Valley Station.

History

Pre-2006

The original Sacramento station was the terminal of the Central Pacific Railroad.  The present building, designed by the San Francisco architectural firm of Bliss and Faville for the Southern Pacific Railroad, was built in 1926 in the Renaissance Revival style. Decorative features include a red tile roof and terracotta trim, as well as large arches on the main facade. Inside, the waiting room has a mural by artist John A. MacQuarrie that depicts the celebration of the groundbreaking for the First transcontinental railroad on January 8, 1863, in Sacramento.  The Central Pacific started from Sacramento and built east to Promontory Summit, Utah, where it met the Union Pacific Railroad.  The station is now owned by the City of Sacramento. With the creation of Amtrak on May 1, 1971, the station became Amtrak-only.  The station was listed on the National Register of Historic Places in 1975 as "Southern Pacific Railroad Company's Sacramento Depot".

For most of Amtrak's first two decades, the only trains calling at Sacramento were long-distance routes. The California Zephyr and its predecessors have served the station from Amtrak's inception; several pre-Amtrak predecessors of the Zephyr stopped in Sacramento from the 1930s onward. The Coast Starlight arrived in 1982. From 1981, the Spirit of California ran as a sleeper to Los Angeles along the far southern leg of the Coast Starlight route. Service expanded dramatically in 1991 with the introduction of the Capitols service, now the Capitol Corridor. Partly due to its success, it is now the second-busiest station in the Western United States, behind only Los Angeles Union Station, and the seventh-busiest station overall.

The Sacramento Regional Transit Gold Line service was extended  to Sacramento Valley Station on December 8, 2006.

Renovation and Railyards project

The City of Sacramento, in conjunction with the Sacramento Railyards Project, is in the process of an extensive and multi-stage renovation project.

The first stage, called the Sacramento Valley Station Intermodal Phase I, was completed on August 13, 2012, with the complete relocation of all heavy-rail passenger platforms (Amtrak) approximately  further north from their previous location. Sacramento Regional Transit Gold Line light rail operations remain in their original location directly behind the station depot.

The second stage, called the Sacramento Valley Station Intermodal Phase II, was extensive work performed on the station depot building itself. This work included long-deferred retrofitting and structural repair, window replacement, accessible accessibility work, Life Safety fire code work including the outward opening of emergency exit doors and panic hardware installation, and both appearance and comfort rehabilitation to make the station better serve the public. As a result, the station interior was full of scaffolding to facilitate the work being undertaken, causing the passenger waiting space to be visibly confined throughout the duration of the renovation. The work also saw the complete relocation of the Amtrak ticket and baggage offices from the 1960s era addition on the back side of the waiting room; and the new offices located in the former station restaurant space on the North wing of the station and are more passenger-friendly. The station renovation was officially concluded on February 23, 2017, with a grand re-opening hosted by city officials.

The third and final stage, called the Sacramento Valley Station Intermodal Phase III, will consist of continued station improvements, including the light rail trackage realignment into a downtown loop, addition of a new bus loop and terminal adjacent to the new platform, and construction of an elevated concourse to replace the current walkway to permanently connect the Railyards development to the north. Additional features will also include new bicycle trails, site preparation for commercial and mixed-residential use surrounding the historic depot, and possible land conversion for the California State Railroad Museum expansion east where parking lots currently exist. This phase is currently still under review, including environmental evaluation and eventual RFPs for construction scheduled in the next 5–10 years.

The city does not plan to immediately vacate the station, but services inside the main Head House building will slowly shift over the coming years as various projects to remodel and retrofit the facility and grounds progress.  Eventually, however, the historic Head House will see less use as a transportation facility as the California High Speed Rail Project progresses, and when the planned Sacramento Intermodal Transportation Center is constructed along 5th Street between the Depot and the new platforms, all passenger services will leave and the historic structure will fully be available for use in other roles. The long-term plan also calls for integrating the proposed Sacramento Streetcar project as well as constructing a loop for light rail lines to enable through-running. As of May 2019, the streetcar project has been indefinitely stalled due to rising costs.

See also
Sacramento station (Western Pacific Railroad) - Former depot in Sacramento, now used for a restaurant

References

External links 

Sacramento Valley Station – City of Sacramento
Sacramento Amtrak Station – USA RailGuide (TrainWeb)

Former Southern Pacific Railroad stations in California
Buildings and structures in Sacramento, California
Railway stations in Sacramento County, California
Transportation in Sacramento, California
Transit centers in the United States
Railway stations on the National Register of Historic Places in California
Railway stations in the United States opened in 1925
National Register of Historic Places in Sacramento, California
Bliss and Faville buildings
Amtrak stations in California
Proposed California High-Speed Rail stations